Mondo Medicale is the second full-length album by American death metal band Impaled. It was released in 2002, and is their second overall for the Deathvomit label.  It features a spoken-word intro by bass player Ross Sewage.

Reception

William York from Allmusic gave the disc 4 of 5 stars, calling it "a fine piece of work that will both please (and, of course, disgust) fans of good-old gory death metal."

Track listing
The Hippocritic Oath (LaBarre, McGrath) - 2:06
Dead Inside (McGrath, Sewage) - 3:53
Raise The Stakes (LaBarre, McGrath, Sewage) - 5:12
Operating Theatre (McGrath, Sewage) - 4:13
Choke On It (LaBarre, McGrath) - 3:44
We Belong Dead (Sewage) - 5:03
The Worms Crawl In (McGrath, Sewage) - 4:22
To Die For (LaBarre, Sewage) - 4:00
Rest In Feces (McGrath, Sewage) - 7:49
Carpe Mortem (McGrath, Sewage) - 1:52

Personnel
Andrew LaBarre: Immoral Surgeon (Lead & Rhythm Guitars, Vocals)
Sean McGrath: General Malpraticioner (Lead & Rhythm Guitars, Vocals)
Ross Sewage: Waste Mismanagement (Bass, Vocals)
Raul Varela: Intoxicologist (Drums, Percussion)
With Rachél Hopkins: Voice-Over

Production
Arranged & Produced By Impaled
Engineered By Mauphistopholes Acevedo & Andrew LaBarre 
Mixed By Andrew LaBarre
Mastered By Colon Davis

References
Official website

2002 albums
Century Media Records albums
Impaled (band) albums